The Mgwirizano Coalition is an electoral alliance in Malawi. At the 20 May 2004 general election, the coalition won 27 out of  194 seats.

Member parties of the coalition are:
Malawi Democratic Party
Malawi Forum for Unity and Development
Movement for Genuine Democratic Change
National Unity Party
People's Progressive Movement
People's Transformation Party
Republican Party

Political parties in Malawi
Political party alliances in Africa